Qeshlaq-e Khan Hoseyn Vadelan may refer to:
Qeshlaq-e Khan Hoseyn Vadelan Hajj Mohammad Taqi
Qeshlaq-e Khan Hoseyn Vadelan Teymur